Rudolph Thaddeus Ash (November 2, 1899 – February 1977) was an American baseball outfielder in the Negro leagues. He played with the Chicago American Giants in 1920 and the Hilldale Club and the Newark Stars in 1926.

References

External links
 and Seamheads

Chicago American Giants players
Hilldale Club players
Newark Stars players
1899 births
1977 deaths
Baseball players from Indiana
People from South Bend, Indiana
Baseball outfielders
20th-century African-American sportspeople